The European Classification (ECLA) is a former patent classification system maintained by the European Patent Office (EPO). The ECLA classification system contains 134 000 subdivisions. It is mainly an extension of the International Patent Classification system, but sometimes modifies its titles and rules. ECLA is used in connection with the indexing system ICO, which serves to identify additional information and aspects that are not covered by the ECLA schemes. ECLA has been replaced by the Cooperative Patent Classification (CPC) as of 1 January 2013.

See also 
 Cooperative Patent Classification (CPC)
 International Patent Classification (IPC)

Notes and references

External links 
 On the Espacenet web site:
 European Classification (ECLA) 
 Coverage of IPC and ECLA classifications
 Search the European classification

Patent classifications